The 2018 Delta State Statesmen football team will represent Delta State University in the 2018 NCAA Division II football season. They will be led by sixth-year head coach Todd Cooley. The Statesmen will played their home games at McCool Stadium and are members of the Gulf South Conference.

Preseason

Gulf South Conference coaches poll
On August 2, 2018, the Gulf South Conference released their preseason coaches poll with the Statesmen predicted to finish in 4th place in the conference.

Preseason All-Gulf South Conference Team
The Statesmen had three players at three positions selected to the preseason all-Gulf South Conference team.

Offense

Innis Claud V – OG

Defense

Ovenson Cledanord – LB

Tramond Lofton – DL

Schedule
Delta State 2018 football schedule consists of five home and away games in the regular season. The Statesmen will host GSC foes Mississippi College, North Greenville, Shorter, and West Florida, and will travel to Florida Tech, Valdosta State, West Alabama and West Georgia.

The Statesmen will host one of the two non-conference games against Grand Valley State from the Great Lakes Intercollegiate Athletic Conference and will travel to Tarleton State from the Lone Star Conference.

Three of the ten games will be broadcast on ESPN3, as part of the Gulf South Conference Game of the Week.

Rankings

Game summaries

at Tarleton State

Grand Valley State

at Florida Tech

North Greenville

West Florida

at Valdosta State

at West Alabama

Shorter

at West Georgia

Mississippi College

References

Delta State
Delta State Statesmen football seasons
Delta State Statesmen football